César Castellanos (November 1, 1947 – November 1, 1998), known as El Gordito Trabajador, was a Honduran politician and Mayor of Tegucigalpa for the National Party at the time of his death. He died when the helicopter he was traveling in crashed due to becoming entangled with electrical wires while he was inspecting damage caused by Hurricane Mitch.

References

1948 births
1998 deaths
Mayors of places in Honduras
National Party of Honduras politicians
Victims of helicopter accidents or incidents